The Energy Tower, also known as The Energy Building is an office building at Sudirman Central Business District in South Jakarta. The tower is 217 meters tall, which has 43 floors. The building is part of Graha Niaga complex.

See also
List of tallest buildings in Indonesia
List of tallest buildings in Jakarta

References

Buildings and structures in Jakarta
Skyscraper office buildings in Indonesia
Towers in Indonesia
Kohn Pedersen Fox buildings
Office buildings completed in 2008